Sheykhlu (also Romanized as Sheykhlū; also known as Sheykhlar, Sheykh Moḩammadlū, Sheyklū, and Shikhli) is a village in Qarah Su Rural District, Meshgin-e Sharqi District, Meshgin Shahr County, Ardabil Province, Iran. At the 2006 census, its population was 162, in 38 families.

References 

Towns and villages in Meshgin Shahr County